Medbury is a rural locality in the Canterbury region of New Zealand's South Island.

Medbury may also refer to:
 Medbury School, Christchurch, New Zealand
 John P. Medbury (died 1942), American humorist
 James Medbury MacKaye (1872-1935), American engineer and philosopher

See also
 Medbury's–Grove Lawn Subdivisions Historic District, Highland Park, Michigan